Danang Wihatmoko is an Indonesian footballer who currently plays for Persijap Jepara as a goalkeeper.

Record
Danang Wihatmoko never had the goal record that he never conceded keep the ball in Indonesia Super League 2009/2010. He's calling in Indonesian national team selection, but because of Danang Wihatmoko was injured so she did not qualify for the national team players.

References
 Profile Danang Wihatmoko
 Record of Danang Wihatmoko

Footnotes

Indonesian footballers
Living people
1982 births
Association football goalkeepers
Persijap Jepara players
Deltras F.C. players
People from Jepara
Sportspeople from Central Java